Mackinder  is a surname. Notable people with the surname include:

 Halford Mackinder (1861–1947), English geographer
 Halford Mackinder Professor of Geography, Oxford university chair
 William Mackinder (1880–1930), British Labour Party politician